Łomża Landscape Park of the Narew Valley is a protected area (Landscape Park) in north-eastern Poland, on the banks of the Narew river, close to the town of Łomża, to the south-east.

Features

The Park lies within the Podlaskie Voivodeship: in Łomża County (covering Gmina Łomża, Gmina Piątnica, Gmina Wizna) and in Zambrów County (Gmina Rutki).

The protected area of the park consists of unique landscape features such as pristine valleys and marshes with high aesthetic appeal. The total area under protection amounts to 19,664 ha, of which 7,353.5 ha lies within the actual park boundaries, and the 12,310.5 ha creates park's protective buffer zone. 

There are two nature reserves in the Park: Kalinowo and Wielki Dział.

See also
 List of Landscape Parks of Poland

External links 
 Website of the Park
 Łomża Landscape Park seen from the drone

References 

Łomża
Łomża County
Zambrów County
Landscape parks in Poland
Parks in Podlaskie Voivodeship